Gabriela Denisse Zavala Irías is a beauty queen who represented Honduras in Miss World 2008 in Johannesburg, South Africa. She studied and plans to work in Tourism.

She previously competed at Miss Earth 2004, where she placed among the top eight finalists and won Best in National Costume.

References

1985 births
Living people
Miss World 2008 delegates
Miss Earth 2004 contestants
Honduran beauty pageant winners